This is a list of years in Algeria. See also the timeline of Algerian history. For only articles about years in Algeria that have been written, see :Category:Years in Algeria.

Twenty-first century

Twentieth century 
2000 - 1999 - 1998 - 1997 - 1996 - 1995 - 1994 - 1993 - 1992 - 1991
1990 - 1989 - 1988 - 1987 - 1986 - 1985 - 1984 - 1983 - 1982 - 1981
1980 - 1979 - 1978 - 1977 - 1976 - 1975 - 1974 - 1973 - 1972 - 1971
1970 - 1969 - 1968 - 1967 - 1966 - 1965 - 1964 - 1963 - 1962 - 1961
1960 - 1959 - 1958 - 1957 - 1956 - 1955 - 1954 - 1953 - 1952 - 1951
1950 - 1949 - 1948 - 1947 - 1946 - 1945 - 1944 - 1943 - 1942 - 1941
1940 - 1939 - 1938 - 1937 - 1936 - 1935 - 1934 - 1933 - 1932 - 1931
1930 - 1929 - 1928 - 1927 - 1926 - 1925 - 1924 - 1923 - 1922 - 1921
1920 - 1919 - 1918 - 1917 - 1916 - 1915 - 1914 - 1913 - 1912 - 1911
1910 - 1909 - 1908 - 1907 - 1906 - 1905 - 1904 - 1903 - 1902 - 1901

Nineteenth century 
1900 - 1899 - 1898 - 1897 - 1896 - 1895 - 1894 - 1893 - 1892 - 1891
1890 - 1889 - 1888 - 1887 - 1886 - 1885 - 1884 - 1883 - 1882 - 1881
1880 - 1879 - 1878 - 1877 - 1876 - 1875 - 1874 - 1873 - 1872 - 1871
1870 - 1869 - 1868 - 1867 - 1866 - 1865 - 1864 - 1863 - 1862 - 1861
1860 - 1859 - 1858 - 1857 - 1856 - 1855 - 1854 - 1853 - 1852 - 1851
1850 - 1849 - 1848 - 1847 - 1846 - 1845 - 1844 - 1843 - 1842 - 1841
1840 - 1839 - 1838 - 1837 - 1836 - 1835 - 1834 - 1833 - 1832 - 1831
1830 - 1829 - 1828 - 1827 - 1826 - 1825 - 1824 - 1823 - 1822 - 1821
1820 - 1819 - 1818 - 1817 - 1816 - 1815 - 1814 - 1813 - 1812 - 1811
1810 - 1809 - 1808 - 1807 - 1806 - 1805 - 1804 - 1803 - 1802 - 1801

Eighteenth century 
1800 - 1799 - 1798 - 1797 - 1796 - 1795 - 1794 - 1793 - 1792 - 1791
1790 - 1789 - 1788 - 1787 - 1786 - 1785 - 1784 - 1783 - 1782 - 1781
1780 - 1779 - 1778 - 1777 - 1776 - 1775 - 1774 - 1773 - 1772 - 1771
1770 - 1769 - 1768 - 1767 - 1766 - 1765 - 1764 - 1763 - 1762 - 1761
1760 - 1759 - 1758 - 1757 - 1756 - 1755 - 1754 - 1753 - 1752 - 1751
1750 - 1749 - 1748 - 1747 - 1746 - 1745 - 1744 - 1743 - 1742 - 1741 
1740 - 1739 - 1738 - 1737 - 1736 - 1735 - 1734 - 1733 - 1732 - 1731
1730 - 1729 - 1728 - 1727 - 1726 - 1725 - 1724 - 1723 - 1722 - 1721
1720 - 1719 - 1718 - 1717 - 1716 - 1715 - 1714 - 1713 - 1712 - 1711
1710 - 1709 - 1708 - 1707 - 1706 - 1705 - 1704 - 1703 - 1702 - 1701

Seventeenth century 
1700 - 1699 - 1698 - 1697 - 1696 - 1695 - 1694 - 1693 - 1692 - 1691
1690 - 1689 - 1688 - 1687 - 1686 - 1685 - 1684 - 1683 - 1682 - 1681
1680 - 1679 - 1678 - 1677 - 1676 - 1675 - 1674 - 1673 - 1672 - 1671
1670 - 1669 - 1668 - 1667 - 1666 - 1665 - 1664 - 1663 - 1662 - 1661
1660 - 1659 - 1658 - 1657 - 1656 - 1655 - 1654 - 1653 - 1652 - 1651
1650 - 1649 - 1648 - 1647 - 1646 - 1645 - 1644 - 1643 - 1642 - 1641
1640 - 1639 - 1638 - 1637 - 1636 - 1635 - 1634 - 1633 - 1632 - 1631
1630 - 1629 - 1628 - 1627 - 1626 - 1625 - 1624 - 1623 - 1622 - 1621
1620 - 1619 - 1618 - 1617 - 1616 - 1615 - 1614 - 1613 - 1612 - 1611
1610 - 1609 - 1608 - 1607 - 1606 - 1605 - 1604 - 1603 - 1602 - 1601

Sixteenth century 
1600 - 1599 - 1598 - 1597 - 1596 - 1595 - 1594 - 1593 - 1592 - 1591
1590 - 1589 - 1588 - 1587 - 1586 - 1585 - 1584 - 1583 - 1582 - 1581
1580 - 1579 - 1578 - 1577 - 1576 - 1575 - 1574 - 1573 - 1572 - 1571
1570 - 1569 - 1568 - 1567 - 1566 - 1565 - 1564 - 1563 - 1562 - 1561
1560 - 1559 - 1558 - 1557 - 1556 - 1555 - 1554 - 1153 - 1552 - 1551
1550 - 1549 - 1548 - 1547 - 1546 - 1545 - 1544 - 1543 - 1542 - 1541
1540 - 1539 - 1538 - 1537 - 1536 - 1535 - 1534 - 1533 - 1532 - 1531
1530 - 1529 - 1528 - 1527 - 1526 - 1525 - 1524 - 1523 - 1522 - 1521
1520 - 1519 - 1518 - 1517 - 1516 - 1515 - 1514 - 1513 - 1512 - 1511
1510 - 1509 - 1508 - 1507 - 1516 - 1505 - 1504 - 1503 - 1502 - 1501

Fifteenth century 
1500 - 1499 - 1498 - 1497 - 1496 - 1495 - 1494 - 1493 - 1492 - 1491
1490 - 1489 - 1488 - 1487 - 1486 - 1485 - 1484 - 1483 - 1482 - 1481
1480 - 1479 - 1478 - 1477 - 1476 - 1475 - 1474 - 1473 - 1472 - 1471
1470 - 1469 - 1468 - 1467 - 1466 - 1465 - 1464 - 1463 - 1462 - 1461
1460 - 1459 - 1458 - 1457 - 1456 - 1455 - 1454 - 1453 - 1452 - 1451
1450 - 1449 - 1448 - 1447 - 1446 - 1445 - 1444 - 1443 - 1442 - 1441
1440 - 1439 - 1438 - 1437 - 1436 - 1435 - 1434 - 1433 - 1432 - 1431
1430 - 1429 - 1428 - 1427 - 1426 - 1425 - 1424 - 1423 - 1422 - 1421
1420 - 1419 - 1418 - 1417 - 1416 - 1415 - 1414 - 1413 - 1412 - 1411
1410 - 1409 - 1408 - 1407 - 1406 - 1405 - 1404 - 1403 - 1402 - 1401

Fourteenth century 
1400 - 1399 - 1398 - 1397 - 1396 - 1395 - 1394 - 1393 - 1392 - 1391
1390 - 1389 - 1388 - 1387 - 1386 - 1385 - 1384 - 1383 - 1382 - 1381
1380 - 1379 - 1378 - 1377 - 1376 - 1375 - 1374 - 1373 - 1372 - 1371
1370 - 1369 - 1368 - 1367 - 1366 - 1365 - 1364 - 1363 - 1362 - 1361
1360 - 1359 - 1358 - 1357 - 1356 - 1355 - 1354 - 1353 - 1352 - 1351
1350 - 1349 - 1348 - 1347 - 1346 - 1345 - 1344 - 1343 - 1342 - 1341
1340 - 1339 - 1338 - 1337 - 1336 - 1335 - 1334 - 1333 - 1332 - 1331
1330 - 1329 - 1328 - 1327 - 1326 - 1325 - 1324 - 1323 - 1322 - 1321
1320 - 1319 - 1318 - 1317 - 1316 - 1315 - 1314 - 1313 - 1312 - 1311
1310 - 1309 - 1308 - 1307 - 1306 - 1305 - 1304 - 1303 - 1302 - 1301

Thirteenth century 
1300 - 1299 - 1298 - 1297 - 1296 - 1295 - 1984 - 1293 - 1292 - 1291
1290 - 1289 - 1288 - 1287 - 1286 - 1285 - 1284 - 1283 - 1282 - 1281
1280 - 1279 - 1278 - 1277 - 1276 - 1275 - 1274 - 1273 - 1272 - 1271
1270 - 1269 - 1268 - 1267 - 1266 - 1265 - 1264 - 1263 - 1262 - 1261
1260 - 1259 - 1258 - 1257 - 1256 - 1255 - 1254 - 1253 - 1252 - 1251
1250 - 1249 - 1248 - 1247 - 1246 - 1245 - 1244 - 1243 - 1242 - 1241
1240 - 1239 - 1238 - 1237 - 1236 - 1235 - 1234 - 1233 - 1232 - 1231
1230 - 1229 - 1228 - 1227 - 1226 - 1225 - 1224 - 1223 - 1222 - 1221
1220 - 1219 - 1218 - 1217 - 1216 - 1215 - 1214 - 1213 - 1212 - 1211
1210 - 1209 - 1208 - 1207 - 1206 - 1205 - 1204 - 1203 - 1202 - 1201

Twelfth century 
1200 - 1199 - 1198 - 1197 - 1196 - 1195 - 1194 - 1193 - 1192 - 1191
1190 - 1189 - 1188 - 1187 - 1186 - 1185 - 1184 - 1183 - 1182 - 1181
1180 - 1179 - 1178 - 1177 - 1176 - 1175 - 1174 - 1173 - 1172 - 1171
1170 - 1169 - 1168 - 1167 - 1166 - 1165 - 1164 - 1163 - 1162 - 1161
1160 - 1159 - 1158 - 1157 - 1156 - 1155 - 1154 - 1153 - 1152 - 1151
1150 - 1149 - 1148 - 1147 - 1146 - 1145 - 1144 - 1143 - 1142 - 1141
1140 - 1139 - 1138 - 1137 - 1136 - 1135 - 1134 - 1133 - 1132 - 1131
1130 - 1129 - 1128 - 1127 - 1126 - 1125 - 1124 - 1123 - 1122 - 1121
1120 - 1119 - 1118 - 1117 - 1116 - 1115 - 1114 - 1113 - 1112 - 1111
1110 - 1109 - 1108 - 1107 - 1106 - 1105 - 1104 - 1103 - 1102 - 1101

Eleventh century 
11th century in Algeria

First millennium AD 
10th century in Algeria
9th century in Algeria
8th century in Algeria
7th century in Algeria
6th century in Algeria
5th century in Algeria
4th century in Algeria
3rd century in Algeria
2nd century in Algeria
First century in Algeria

See also 
 
 Timeline of Algiers
 Timeline of Oran
 List of years by country

Bibliography

External links
 
 

Algeria history-related lists
 
Algeria